Alfredo Sivocci (4 January 1891 – 10 July 1980) was an Italian racing cyclist. He won stage 11 of the 1911 Giro d'Italia.

References

External links
 

1891 births
1980 deaths
Italian male cyclists
Italian Giro d'Italia stage winners
Cyclists from Milan